Greger is a given name. Notable people with the given name include:

Greger Andrijevski (born 1973), Swedish footballer
Greger Artursson (born 1972), Swedish ice hockey player
Greger Forslöw (born 1961), Swedish fencer
Greger Larson, evolutionary geneticist
Greger Lewenhaupt (1920–2008), equestrian

See also

 Greger, surname
 Gregers, another given name

Swedish masculine given names